O sa mirë is a Kosovar-Albanian television sitcom. It premiered on T HD, on October 7, 2013. The renewed series is produced by Gurmania J.S.C. and it airs on Klan Kosova.

The series follows a group of students at the private university O sa mirë. The students come from different Albanian-speaking regions of Albania, Kosovo, Macedonia, and Montenegro. The sitcom bases its humor on Albanian regional stereotypes and the interactions between the different sub-cultures.

Premise
Students from Albanian-speaking regions of Albania, Kosovo, Macedonia, and Montenegro, attend the private university O sa mirë. Following the day-to-day life of the students, misunderstandings often occur due to different spoken Albanian dialects, as well as comical situations involving the teachers. The show focuses on the members of the Physics, History, Music, Physical Education, and English classes of the university.

Cast
Enver Petrovci as Gazmend Berisha, the Rector of the university.
Olta Daku as Jana Hajdari, the Physics teacher who originates from Fier.
Helidon Fino as Alfred Havolli, a student from Tirana. He is Rrahman Havolli's cousin.
Armend Ismaili as Rron Gazuli, a student from Pristina. Used to live in Dublin.
Jonida Vokshi as Elizabeta Berisha, a student and daughter of the Rector, Gazmend Berisha. Originates from Tirana. Used to live in Milan.
Xhevdet Jashari as Arifhikmet Abdylmenafi, a student from Tetovo.
Eftiola Laçka as Sara Kocaqi, a student from Korça.
Edi Kastrati as Arbnor Ramabaja, a student from Gjakova.
Jeton Zogiani as Haki Kurtaj, a student from Drenica. Works in the government of Kosovo.
Shkelzen Veseli as Benjamin Shehu, the music teacher.
Linda Jarani as Rozafa Kroi, a student from villages of Shkodër.
Besnik Krapi as Mensur Ozil, a student from Prizren.
Kushtrim Qerimi as Rrahman Havolli, a student from Gjilan. He is Alfred Havolli's cousin.
Luran Ahmeti as Profesori Historisë (History teacher), originates from Skopje.
Koço Devole as Akil Boga, the History teacher. Originates from Berat. (season one)
Albulena Kryeziu as Tringa Belegu, a student from Peja. Used to live in New York City. (season one)
Ylber Bardhi as Zuka, the bartender at the schools coffeehouse, originates from Deçan.
Ema Uka as Lyra, a student from Pristina. Used to live in California. 
Anita Nikaj as Lul Gruda, a student from Tuzi.
Majlinda Kasumoviç as the secretary of the Rector who originates from Pristina.
Ernest Zymberi as Llukman Avdili, a student from Preševo.
Gent Hazizi as Aleks Qako, a student from Lazarat.

Broadcast 
The series premiered on October 7, 2013. The first season consisted of 12 episodes. The second season started broadcasting on January 27, 2014. The third season consisted of 30 episodes. The third season was supposed to be the last, but it was renewed for a fourth season; only half of the cast from the previous seasons returned. The fourth season is broadcast every Sunday evening at 20:00, on KTV.

References

External links 
 Ardianë Pajaziti: “O sa mirë”, seriali që po i bashkon shqiptarët („O sa mirë“, die Serie, welche die Albaner zusammenbringt). In: KultPlus
 Valeria Dedaj: Seriali televiziv “O sa mirë…”, e gjithë Shqipëria etnike në një auditor (Fernsehserie „O sa mirë“, ganzes ethnisches Albanien in einem Auditorium). In: Shekulli vom 24. Februar 2014
 Seriali "O sa mirë", thyen rekorde shikueshmërie (Serie „O sa mirë“ bricht Zuschauerrekorde). In: Zëri.info vom 3. Mai 2014
 Mimozë Lakna: Seriali “O sa mirë”, shembull i mrekullueshëm i bashkëpunimit të artistëve shqiptarë (Serie „O sa mirë“, wunderbares Beispiel zur Zusammenarbeit albanischer Schauspieler). In: Kosovarja vom 18. Dezember 2013

Albanian television shows